Frank Enea is an American musician and songwriter known as the composer, backup vocalist, and guitarist of the band B.E.R. from the Teen Titans Go! animated series. He is known for writing The Night Begins to Shine which peaked at #23 on the Billboard Hot Rock songs chart and #1 on the iTunes Rock song chart. "Forever Mine" and "Rise Up" were featured on the soundtrack Teen Titans Go! (Songs from The Night Begins to Shine Special) which peaked at #8 on the Billboard Kid Albums chart and #17 on the Billboard Soundtracks chart. He is a founding member of Frank Enea & the Crooked Hearts, and his music has appeared in several television shows, commercials, and the film Brilliant Mistakes.

The Night Begins to Shine was originally written and produced in 2005 as an "'80s-style song" for a music library. The song was first featured in the Teen Titans Go! episode, "Slumber Party" as a throwaway joke. The song became popular with fans of the show. The song was subsequently featured in the episode, "40%, 40%, 20%", and was prominently featured in two specials, the four-part 2017 special "The Day the Night Stopped Beginning to Shine and
Became Dark Even Though It Was the Day" and a five-part sequel released in 2020, "The Night Begins To Shine 2". The special also featured two other songs by B.E.R., "Forever Mine" and "Rise Up", as well as three covers of the song from Fall Out Boy, CeeLo Green, and Puffy AmiYumi.

Discography

Albums

Singles

References 

Teen Titans
Living people
1965 births